Patrick W. Wright (July 5, 1868 – May 29, 1943) was a professional baseball player. He played in one game in Major League Baseball for the Chicago Colts of the National League on July 11, 1890 as a second baseman.

Wright had an extensive career in minor league baseball. He played on and off for over twenty years, from 1888 until 1909. He also served as player-manager for several teams between 1894 and 1901.

External links

Major League Baseball second basemen
Chicago Colts players
Danville Browns players
Springfield Senators players
London Tecumsehs (baseball) players
Evansville Hoosiers players
Tacoma (minor league baseball) players
Terre Haute Hottentots players
Green Bay (minor league baseball) players
Peoria Distillers players
New Orleans Pelicans (baseball) players
Jacksonville Lunatics players
Peoria Blackbirds players
Omaha Omahogs players
St. Joseph Saints players
New Castle Quakers players
Youngstown Little Giants players
Marion Glass Blowers players
Newark Sailors players
Little Rock Travelers players
Minor league baseball managers
Baseball players from Pennsylvania
Sportspeople from Pottsville, Pennsylvania
19th-century baseball players
1868 births
1943 deaths